John Pemberton (1831–1888) was an American druggist and the inventor of Coca-Cola.

John Pemberton may also refer to:
 John C. Pemberton (1814–1881), Confederate Civil War general
 John Pemberton (footballer) (born 1964), English former footballer
 Jack Pemberton (1883–1968), Australian rules footballer with Richmond
 John Pemberton (anthropologist) (born 1948), anthropologist and professor
 John Stapylton Grey Pemberton (1860–1940), British Member of Parliament for Sunderland, 1900–1906
 John Pemberton (physician) (1912–2010), British epidemiologist
 Johnny Pemberton (born 1981), American actor and comedian